Sinte Gleska University (SGU) is a public tribal land-grant university in Mission, South Dakota, on the Rosebud Indian Reservation. This is a Brulé Lakota Indian Reservation home to the Sicangu (Burnt Thigh). SGU has an enrollment of 828 full and part-time students. It is regionally accredited by the Higher Learning Commission.

History
SGU was founded in 1971. SGU was named for the Brulé Lakota chief Sinte Gleska. The founding Board President was Lakota elder Stanley Red Bird Sr., and Joseph M. Marshall III, the first published writer in Lakota, was a founder as well. In 1994, the college was designated a land-grant college alongside 31 other tribal colleges.

Partnerships
The college is a member of the American Indian Higher Education Consortium, a community of tribally and federally chartered institutions working to strengthen tribal nations. Tribal colleges generally serve geographically isolated populations who have no other means accessing higher education; they also are a means for the tribes to teach subjects from the perspectives of their cultures, as well as specific classes in their cultures.

Academics

SGU describes its approach to higher education as focusing on "an educational direction and philosophy that both promotes and preserves our Lakol Wicohan (traditional way of life) for the benefit of our future generations."

The university offers 25 associate degrees, 23 bachelor's degrees, two master's degrees, a dozen certificate programs, and several vocation programs through seven academic undergraduate departments:

Great Plains Art Institute
Arts and Sciences 
Business
Education
Human Services
Lakota Studies
Institute of Technologies (vocational/career education)

The college has programs in Lakota studies, including the language and aesthetics. As of 2011, it is one of seven tribal colleges in the U.S. to offer a degree related to tribal administration.

The Great Plains Art Institute of the University offers AA and BA degrees in art and a BAAE degree in art education.

SGU sponsors the annual Northern Plains Indian Art Market in Sioux Falls, South Dakota, which includes a juried art show, art market, powwow, and Oscar Howe lecture. The market aims to educate students and the community about Northern Plains art, philosophy, dance, and music.

SGU has partnered with Red Crow Community College and Old Sun Community College, both in Alberta, Canada, enabling them to offer a master's degree in education, with an emphasis in early childhood special education.

Notable faculty
LeAnne Howe (Choctaw Nation of Oklahoma)
Joe L. Kincheloe (1950–2008)
Simon J. Ortiz (Acoma Pueblo)
Albert White Hat (1929–2013)
Doris Leader Charge (1931-2001)

See also
American Indian College Fund (AICF)

References

External links

Rosebud Indian Reservation
Private universities and colleges in South Dakota
American Indian Higher Education Consortium
Educational institutions established in 1970
Buildings and structures in Todd County, South Dakota
Education in Todd County, South Dakota
1970 establishments in South Dakota